is a private university in Habikino, Osaka, Japan. The predecessor of the school was founded in 1922, and it was chartered as a junior women's college in 1957. The school became a four-year college in 1967, and it became coeducational in 1981, adopting the present name at the same time. The school is also known as International Buddhist University, or IBU.

Name
Shitennō (四天王) refers to the Four Heavenly Kings (Dhrtarastra, Virudhaka, Virupaksa, and Vaisravana). Ji (寺) means temple.

See Shitennoji.

History
About 1400 years ago Prince Shōtoku went to this place to study Buddhism, and it was founded as a place of education.

References

External links
 Official website 

Educational institutions established in 1922
Private universities and colleges in Japan
Buddhist universities and colleges in Japan
Universities and colleges in Osaka Prefecture
Shitennō-ji
1922 establishments in Japan
Habikino